Bridgman Glacier is a steep glacier falling away from the west side of Hallett Peninsula and forming a floating ice tongue on the east shore of Edisto Inlet between Salmon Cliff and Roberts Cliff. It was named by the New Zealand Geological Survey Antarctic Expedition, 1957–58, for Lieutenant Albert H. Bridgman, MC, U.S. Navy, surgeon and U.S. Navy Operation Deepfreeze leader at Hallett Station in 1959.

References
 

Glaciers of Borchgrevink Coast